The All India & South Asia Rugby Tournament is an amateur league competition for rugby union football clubs in India. The competition has been played since 1924. In 2017 ten teams took part in the men's edition, with Delhi Hurricanes securing the championship. The 2016 tournament also saw the first women's XVs rugby competition, with six teams participating, and the championship going to the team from the Odisha Rugby Football Association.

History
After the Calcutta Cup and rugby union in India became popular the Rugby Football Union decided to give Calcutta Cricket and Football Club a similar cup, which was named the All India & South Asia Rugby Tournament. The cup has been played every year since.

In 2011 the tournament started to gain some publicity and soon after the cup began Army Red emerged as champions.

2018 qualifying teams
In 2018, the 85th All India & South Asia Rugby Tournament was held at Bombay Gymkhana grounds between 22–29 September with 10 teams competing in the men's category.

In the women's category there were 8 teams.

2017 qualifying teams

In 2017 the All India & South Asia Rugby Tournament was held at CCFC between 7 - 14 October with 10 teams competing in the men's category.

In the women's category there were 8 teams.

2016 qualifying teams

In 2016 the All India & South Asia Rugby Tournament was held at CCFC between 17 - 24 September with 12 teams competing in the men's category.

For the first time women competed in a rugby XVs tournament, with six teams participating.

2015 qualifying teams

Results
These are the list of champions of the All India & South Asia Rugby Tournament since 2000.

Bombay Gymkhana have won the competition fifteen times, Army Red and La Martinière Old Boys eight times, Armenian Sports Club six times, the Delhi Hurricanes three times and Chennai Cheetahs have been successful twice.

These are the list of champions of the Women's All India & South Asia Rugby Tournament since its inaugural version in 2016.

References

Rugby union in India
Recurring sporting events established in 1924
Rugby union competitions in India